Big Band Explosion is the tenth solo (and twelfth overall) album by Nina Hagen, released in 2003, featuring the Leipzig Big Band.

Critical reception
The Allmusic review by David Jeffries awarded the album 3 stars stating "The lady was born to entertain, and if you're warm to her in-your-face absurdity, Big Band Explosion is a heck of a lot of fun. You'll be on the edge of your seat as the singer delivers the tunes straight-faced, but you just know that any moment she's going to bust out the brash Nina of old.".

Track listing 

 "Let Me Entertain You" (Jules Styne, Stephen Sondheim) - 2:47
 "Sugar Blues" (Clarence Williams, Lucy Fletcher) - 3:26
 "I Want to Be Happy" (Irving Caesar, Vincent Youmans) - 2:35
 "The Lady Loves Me" (Roy C. Bennett, Sid Tepper) - 4:14 duet with Lucas Alexander
 "Rhythm & Romance" (George Whiting, J.C. Johnson, Nat Schwartz) - 3:06
 "Rainbow" (E.Y. Harburg, Harold Arlen) - 4:28
 "If You Ever Should Leave" (Sammy Cohen, Saul Chaplin) - 2:38
 "Fever" (Eddy Cooley, John Davenport) - 4:52
 "Love & Kisses" (Paul Francis Webster, Rudolf Friml) - 3:11
 "All Over Nothing @ All" (Arthur Altman, Jack Lawrence) - 3:34
 "Let's Call the Whole Thing Off" (George Gershwin, Ira Gershwin) 3:28 duet with Lucas Alexander
 "Starlit Hour" (Mitchell Parish, Peter De Rose) - 4:17

Personnel
Musicians
 Nina Hagen – vocals, concept, cover photo, creative consultant
 Frank Nowicky - alto saxophone, bandleader
 Michael Arnold – tenor saxophone
 Andrea Bauer – baritone saxophone
 Wolfram Dix – percussion
 Torsten Hell – trumpet
 Matthias Büttner - trombone
 Hans-Peter Fechner - bass trombone
 Jack Roth – drums
 Ralf Schrabbe – keyboards, piano

Production
 Michael Schöbel – concept, creative consultant
 Jim Steinfeldt – photography
 Ansgar Striepens – arranger
 Peter Herbolzheimer – arranger
 Andy Jackson – mastering
 Michael Wolff – mixing, producer, vocal engineer

References

2003 albums
Nina Hagen albums